The height of structures in the United States has been poorly documented. However, the data is a matter of public record, appearing in documents maintained by the Federal Aviation Administration (FAA) and Federal Communications Commission (FCC).

This list is populated heavily by antenna masts. The engineering aspects of super-tall masts are highly specialized. Only four companies erect the majority of such structures: Doty Moore Tower Services (Cedar Hill, Texas); Kline Towers (Columbia, South Carolina); LeBlanc Royal Telecom (Oakville, Ontario); and Stainless Inc. (North Wales, Pennsylvania). The design and construction are largely governed by RS222E Electronic Industries Alliance standards. A  mast costs between $0.7 and $1.1 million to build, while a  mast costs $2.4 to $4 million. Prices generally vary depending on tower capacity and wind loading specifications.

A common misperception is that landmarks such as the Stratosphere Tower are the tallest United States structures, but they are in fact the tallest buildings. Likewise Taipei 101 was often misrepresented as the world's tallest structure (although it was the tallest occupied building, before the certification of Dubai's Burj Khalifa as such), but in fact is far eclipsed by antenna towers in over a dozen states in the United States and in other countries.

In the United States, the FAA and the FCC must approve all towers exceeding  in height. The FCC presumes them to be inconsistent with the public interest, while the FAA presumes them to be a hazard to air navigation, resulting in poor airspace usage. A significant burden of proof is placed on the applicant to show that such a structure is in the public's best interests. Only when both agencies have resolved all legal, safety, and management concerns is such an application approved.

Since 1978 the United States has maintained eleven tethered aerostats sites along the southern borders. However, since the balloons are aided by buoyancy and are not permanent they are not considered true structures.

State-by-state listing

Alabama
 WTTO Television Tower (Birmingham WB-21)
 Windham Springs
 Year Built: 1986
 At 2,000 ft (610 m), this structure ties 19 others around the United States as the seventh-tallest structure in the world.
 RSA Battle House Tower
 Height: 745 ft (227 m)
 Mobile, Alabama
 Tallest Freestanding building in Alabama, and the tallest building on the coast between New York and Houston 
It has a fiberglass spire on the top of the building that supports the antenna
The building has a crown inside it which is visible up to 30 miles away (48.1 km)
 35 Floors

Alaska
 LORAN-C transmitter Port Clarence
 Height: 1,350 ft (411 m)
 Port Clarence
 Year built: 1961
 Owner: U.S. Coast Guard
 Demolished on April 28, 2010
 Knik TV Mast
 Height: 808 ft (246 m)
 Knik
 Year Built: 1986
 Owner: Alaska Public Telecommunications Inc

Arizona
 Midwest Tower Dolan Springs
 Height: 1,299 ft (396.3 m)
 Dolan Springs
 Year built: 2000
 Chimney of Hayden Smelter
 Height: 1,001 ft (305 m)
 Flue gas stacks of the Navajo Generating Station
 Height: 775 ft (236 m)
 Page
 Year built: 1996-1998
 Owner: U.S. Bureau of Reclamation (24.3%), SRP (21.7%), Los Angeles Dept. of Water and Power (21.2%), Arizona Public Service Co. (14.0%), NV Energy (11.3%), Tucson Electric Power (7.5%)
 The Navajo Generating Station, a coal-fired power plant located 4 miles (6 km) east of Page, has three 775 ft (236 m) lined, reinforced concrete stacks. The plant's original stacks were demolished in the late 1990s after being replaced by larger diameter stacks of the same height. The new stacks were required to accommodate cooler, saturated flue gas that resulted when wet SO2 scrubbers were added.
 The tallest radio tower is the 650 ft (198 m) KSZR (97.5) tower in Oro Valley near Tucson.

Arkansas
 KTVE Television Tower (El Dorado NBC 10)
 Height: 1970 ft (600.4 m)
 Bolding
 Year built: 1987
 Owner: Grapevine Communications

California
 KXTV/KOVR Television Tower
 Height: 2,049 ft (624.5 m)
 Walnut Grove
 Year built: 2000
 Owner: Gannett/CBS
 This is the sixth-tallest structure in the world, just behind KVLY-TV mast and KRDK-TV mast in North Dakota (Burj Khalifa is the tallest manmade structure in the world). KXTV (ABC News 10) and KOVR (CBS 13), serve the Sacramento – Stockton – Modesto market. The tower has been used for research ozone sampling at different heights.
 In the same area, there are the 2,000 ft (609.6 m) high Hearst-Argyle Tower and the 1,994 ft (607.8 m) high Channel 40 Tower.

Colorado
 Radio communications tower: KJHM, KFCO
 Height: 1,996 ft (608 m)
 Hoyt
 Year built: 2003
 Owner: Max Radio of Denver.
 Tower primarily used for penetration into the Denver radio market.

Connecticut
 WTIC Television Tower (Hartford Fox 61)
 Height: 1,339 ft (408 m)
 Farmington
 Year built: 1984
 Owner: Communications Site Management LLC

Delaware
 WBOC Television Tower (Salisbury CBS 16) 
 Height: 1,000 ft (305 m)
 Laurel, Delaware
 Year built: 2000
 Owner: WBOC

District of Columbia
 Hughes Memorial Tower
 Height: 765 ft (232 m)
 Washington
 Year built: 1989
 Owner: District of Columbia Office of Property Management
 Operator: Washington, D.C. Police Department
 WTTG Television Tower
 Height: 705 ft (215 m)
 Washington
 Year built: 1963
 Owner: WTTG Fox
 Washington Monument
 Height: ~ 555 ft (~169 m)
 Washington
 Year built: 1884
 Operator:  National Park Service

Florida
  WTVY-TV Tower (Dothan, Alabama market)
 Height: 1,901 ft (579 m) 2,049 ft ASL
 Bethlehem
 Year built: 1978
 Owner: Gray Television

 WCIX TV Tower
 Homestead
 Height: 1,801 ft (549 m)
 Destroyed in 1992
 Rebuilt

Georgia
 WCTV Television Tower (Tallahassee CBS 6)
 Height: 2,000 ft (609 m)
 Metcalf
 Year built: 1987
 Owner: Gray Midamerica TV

Hawaii
 Navy VLF Antenna
 Height: 1,503 ft (458 m)
 Lualualei
 Year built: 1972
 Owner: U.S. Navy / ROICC Pearl Harbor
 The record is held by two towers, exactly identical, that reach 1,503 ft (458 m) high. They are used to communicate with submarines throughout the Pacific basin.

Idaho
 KMVT
 Height: 682 ft (208 m)
 Jerome
 Year built: 1961
 Owner: KMVT Broadcasting

Illinois
 Willis Tower
 Height: 1,730 ft (527 m)
 Chicago
 Year built: 1974
 Owner: TrizecHahn Office Properties

Indiana
 WTTV Television Tower (Bloomington WB 4)
 Height: 
 Trafalgar
 Year built: 1957
 Owner: Tribune
 WTVW Television Tower (Evansville Fox 7)
 Height: 
 Chandler
 Year Built: 1956
 Owner: Nexstar Broadcasting, Inc.

Iowa
 WOI Television Tower (Des Moines ABC 5)
 Height: 2,000 ft (609.6 m)
 Alleman
 Year built: 1972
 Owner: NYT Broadcast Holdings LLC
 Des Moines Hearst-Argyle Television Tower Alleman
Height: 2,000 ft (609.6 m)
 Alleman (41°48'35.0" N, 93°37'17.0" W)
 Year built: 1974
 KCAU TV Tower
Height: 2,000 ft (609.6 m)
 Sioux City (42°35'11.0" N, 96°13'57.0" W)
 Year built: 1965
 AFLAC Tower
Height: 2,000 ft (609.4 m)
Rowley (42°24'02.0" N, 91°50'37.0" W )
 Year built: 1984
 American Towers Tower Elkhart
Height: 2,000 ft (609.3 m)
Elkhart (41°49'48.0" N, 93°36'54.6" W)
 Year built: 2001

Kansas
 KWCH 12 Tower (Wichita CBS 12)
 Height: 1,501 ft (458 m)
 Burrton
 Year built: 1963
 Owner: Gray Television
 This was KTVH-TV until 1983, when it became KWCH-TV. Signal also broadcast on DT on Ch 19.

Kentucky
 WAVE Television Tower (Louisville NBC 3) – no longer used
 Height: 1,739 ft (530 m)
 La Grange
 Year built: 1990
 Owner: Subcarrier Communications
 This tower was built to allow WAVE to reach into parts of the Cincinnati, OH market, which sacrificed the western part of the Louisville DMA. They abandoned a tower in Floyds Knobs, IN when the La Grange tower went on the air. They have since put their HD antenna and transmitter at the Indiana site and abandoned the La Grange tower.

Louisiana
 KNOE-TV, KMLU, and KLTM-TV shared tower
 Height: 1,984 ft (604.7m)
 Columbia
 Year built: 1998
 Owner: American Tower Corporation.
 Now current tallest tower after the WZRH/KVDU tower collapsed.
 WZRH/KVDU Radio Tower (New Orleans 92.3/104.1 FM)
 Height: 2,000 ft (610 m)
 Vacherie
 Year built: 1986
 Owners: Cumulus and iHeartMedia; Cumulus is managing partner
 Tower Collapsed in late August, 2021 during Hurricane Ida

Maine
 WMTW Television Tower (Portland ABC 8)
 Height: 1,667 ft (508 m)
 Baldwin
 Year built: 2001
 Owner: Hearst Stations Inc.
 This tower was built in 2001 to replace WMTW's transmitting facility atop Mount Washington (New Hampshire). It began transmitting on February 5, 2002. The second-tallest structure is the WGME (CBS-13) tower in Raymond, which measures 1,624 ft (495 m).

Maryland
 WBFF Television Tower (Baltimore Fox 45)
 Height: 1,280 ft (390 m)
 Baltimore
 Year built: 1987
 Owner: Cunningham Communications/Sinclair
 Second-highest is WMDT-TV ABC/47 (Salisbury) at 1,027 ft (313 m), near Sharptown.

Massachusetts
 WUNI-TV Tower (Worcester/Boston Univision)
 Height: 1,350 ft (411.5m)
 Boylston
 Year Built: 1969
 Owner: Entravision Communications Corporation
 WGBH/WBZ/WCVB Cluster (Boston PBS/CBS/ABC)
 Height: 1,296 ft (395 m)
 Needham
 Year built: 1957
 Owner: American Tower Corporation

Michigan
 WEYI-TV Tower
 Height: 1,132 ft (403.2 m)
 Clio
 Year built: 1972
 Owner: Barrington Broadcasting
 FCC ASRN: 1010544
 WCML Television Tower Atlanta (Alpena PBS 6)
 Height: 1,349.11 ft (411.21 m)
 Atlanta 
 Year built: 1972. Replaced with a newer, but shorter tower in 2010.
 Owner: Central Michigan University
 FCC ASRN: 1002163 (Old tower), 1274349 (New tower)
 Because of the replacement, this tower is no longer the tallest in Michigan

Minnesota
 KPXM Television Tower (Minneapolis ION 41)
 Height: 1,505 ft (459 m)
 Big Lake
 Year built: 1997 (Tower actually constructed in 1982 by the now defunct L.E.O. Broadcasting of St. Cloud Minnesota.)
 Owner: Paxson Minneapolis / KXLI
 This station is licensed to St. Cloud; attempts to cover both that city and Minneapolis/St. Paul from a site between the two cities; and used to be known as KXLI-TV.

Mississippi
 WLBT Television Tower (Jackson NBC 3)
 Height: 1,998 ft (609 m)
 Raymond
 Year built: 1999
 Owner: Raycom Media

Missouri
 Rohn Tower/KMOS Tower
 Height: 2,000 ft (609.6 m)
 Syracuse
 Year built: 2001
 Owner: Central Missouri State University
 KY3 Tower 1
 Height: 2,000 ft (609.4 m)
 Fordland
 Year built: 2000
 Owner: KYTV
 KY3 Tower 2
 Height: 1,996 ft (608.4 m)
 Marshfield
 Year built: 1973
 Owner: KYTV
 KOZK Television Tower (Springfield PBS 21)
 Height: 1,960 ft (597.4 m)
 Fordland
 Year built: 1971
 Collapsed in 2018 during tower modifications for the FCC spectrum repack. Was not rebuilt.
 Owner: Missouri State University (Former SW Missouri State University)

Montana
 KTGF Television Tower (Great Falls NBC 16)
 Height: 801 ft (244 m)
 Great Falls
 Year built: 1986
 Owner: Max Media of Montana

Nebraska
 KLKN Television Tower (Lincoln ABC 8)
 Height: 1,854 ft (565 m)
 Genoa
 Year built: 1969
 Owner: Citadel Communications
 The KDUH-TV tower of 1,965 ft (599 m) at Hemingford collapsed in early 2003 during reinforcement work. The replacement tower is 160 m (about 500 ft) shorter than the original. KXVO and KPTM in Omaha (which are co-owned) have an FCC construction permit to build a taller tower that would put their antennas 577 m (roughly 1,900 ft) up. There was also a -mast at Hemingford, which collapsed in 2002.

Nevada
 Shamrock Tower
 Height: 1,464 ft (446.2 m)
 Jessup, Nevada
 Year built: 2012
 Owner: Shamrock Communications, Inc.; Scranton, PA
 The BREN Tower, located in Jackass Flats (Area 25) of the Nevada Test Site, was a mast that was built for nuclear radiation testing. The 465-meter-tall, 345-ton structure was constructed by Columbus, Ohio-based Dresser-Ideco in 1962. It was originally erected in Yucca Flat (Area 4) before being dismantled in 1966 and moved to Area 25. The mast was owned by the Department of Energy and maintained by National Security Technologies.  On 23 May 2012 the BREN Tower was demolished. The tallest structure in Nevada since mid-2012 is the Shamrock Tower in Jessup, Nevada at 446.2 meters tall, erected in mid-2012.  The second-tallest structure in Nevada is the Moapa Entravision Tower at Moapa, a 426.7 metres tall guyed TV mast at Moapa erected in 2008, the third-tallest is the 401-meter Moapa Kemp Tower at Moapa, the fourth-tallest is Stratosphere Tower near downtown Las Vegas, which was erected in 1994–96 and reaches 1,149 ft (350 m) and 921 ft (281 m) without the mast. It is also the second-tallest freestanding structure in the western U.S. after the Kennecott Smokestack in Utah.

New Hampshire
 WRLP Tower
 Height: 663 ft (202 m)
 Winchester
 Year built: 1966
 Owner: Gunn Mountain Communications
 Was used for WRLP-32. Now only used by two-way radio communication services.

New Jersey
 WWSI Television Tower (Philadelphia Telemundo 62)
 Height: 1,000 ft (305 m)
 Tuckerton
 Year built: 2000
 Owner: Telemundo Mid-Atlantic LLC

New Mexico
 KBIM Television Tower (Roswell CBS 10)
 Height: 1,837 ft (560 m)
 Roswell
 Year built: 1965
 Owner: Nexstar Media, Inc.

New York
Tallest structure in New York was the north tower of the World Trade Center from 1973 to 2001, with an overall height including the antenna mast of 1,727 ft (526.3 m). The original World Trade Center towers were destroyed in the September 11, 2001 terrorist attacks, temporarily making the Empire State Building the tallest building in New York, until the completion of One World Trade Center in May 2013.
 One World Trade Center is the tallest building in the western hemisphere, and the third-tallest building in the world by pinnacle height.
 One World Trade Center
 Height: 1,776 ft (541.3m) (architectural height)
 New York City, New York
 Year completed: May 10, 2013
 Owner: Port Authority of New York and New Jersey
 Stories: Total - 105 (86 usable above-ground floors, 91–99 and 103–104 designated as mechanical space, 100-102 observation floors, top floor designated as 105)
 Total height (including pinnacle): 1,792 ft
 WSPX-TV Tower
 Height: 1,176 ft (358.4 m)
 West Monroe
 Year built: 1998
 Owner: Spectrasite through American Towers
 FCC ASRN: 1059064
 Tallest guyed mast in New York State

North Carolina
 WBTV Television Tower (Charlotte CBS 3)
 Height: 2,000 ft (609.6 m)
 Dallas
 Year built: 1984
 Owner: Gray Media Group.
 WITN/WNCT Television Tower/WNCT 107.9 FM Radio (Eastern North Carolina NBC/CBS)
 Height: 1,985 ft (605 m)
 Grifton
 Year Built: 1979
 Owner: Tall Towers, Inc. (joint venture between WITN and WNCT)
 WRAL Television Tower
 Height: 2,000 ft (609.5 m)
 Auburn
 Built in 1989 as replacement for two masts of the same height, which collapsed during an ice storm.

North Dakota
 KVLY Television Tower (Fargo NBC 11)
 Height: 1,987 ft (605.6 m)
 Blanchard
 Year built: 1963
 Owner: Gray Media
 This tower was known as the KTHI Television Tower until June 1995. It was the fourth-tallest structure in the world, eclipsed only by the Burj Khalifa in Dubai, United Arab Emirates (completed in 2009), the Tokyo Sky Tree in Tokyo, Japan (completed in 2012) and the Shanghai Tower. From 1974 until its collapse in 1991, the Warsaw radio mast in Poland also eclipsed the KVLY-TV mast. This tower is used so KVLY-TV can cover both Fargo and Grand Forks. In 2019, the top mount antenna was removed, dropping the overall height to 1,987 ft (605.6 m)
 KRDK-TV Television Tower (Fargo/Valley City CBS 4)
 Height: 2,060 ft (628 m)
 Galesburg
 Year built: 1998
 The KRDK-TV tower is the world's fourth-tallest man-made structure. It had collapsed three times due to winter and summer storms, though the first time it collapsed in 1968, it was caused from a Marine helicopter cutting four guy wires of the tower. The KVLY TV tower, was the world's fourth-tallest man-made structure, is only about five miles (8 km) from the KRDK-TV tower. This tower is used so KRDK-TV can cover both Fargo and Grand Forks until 2019 when the height was reduced..

Ohio
SpectraSite Communications LLC (Youngstown CBS 27)
 Height: 1,447 ft (441 m)
 Boardman
 Year built: 1976
 Owner: American Tower
 There was a taller tower from 1987 or 1988 until 1994 or 1995 when it was dismantled. It belonged to WCOM-TV (Mansfield Ind 68) and was located just south of Butler, Ohio. WCOM-TV signed on March 3, 1988. WCOM-TV used the tall tower and a directional antenna to try to serve the Columbus market. The station went dark in 1991 and the tower was sold to a religious broadcaster in South Carolina to be used as two separate  towers. An engineer has reported that part of the tower was still on the ground in Sumter, South Carolina.
 WNWO Television Tower (Toledo NBC 24)
 Height: 1,437 ft (438 m)
 Oregon
 Year built: 1983
 Owner: Barrington Broadcasting
Educational Media Foundation (Portsmouth K-Love)
 Height: 1,220 ft (371.9 m)
 Southshore
 Year built: 2006
 Owner: Educational Media Foundation

Oklahoma
 Perry Broadcasting Tower (KVSP 103.5 FM)
 Height: 2,000 ft (609.5 m)
 Carnegie
 FCC database lists tower as being in Alfalfa, Oklahoma, a nonincorporated community north of Carnegie
 At , this is the tallest structure in Oklahoma.
 It is used solely for the broadcast of KVSP 103.5 FM (Power 103.5), with studios in Oklahoma City.
 Year built: 2004
 Owner: Perry Broadcasting of Southwest Oklahoma
 KTUL Television Tower (Tulsa ABC 8)
 Height: 1,909 ft (582 m)
 Coweta
 Year built: 1988
 Owner: KTUL, LLC

Oregon
 KPDX Television Tower (Portland PDX 49)
 Height: 1,081 ft (329 m)
 Portland
 Year built: 1983
 Owner: KPDX-TV (PDX 49) / Meredith Corporation

Pennsylvania
 WPVI Television Tower (Philadelphia ABC 6)
 Height: 1,276 ft (389 m)
 Philadelphia
 Year built: 1998
 Owner: WPVI Inc./CBS
 Homer City Generating Station
 Height: 1,217 ft (371 m)
 Year built: 1969
 Owner: Edison International
 Tallest chimney in the United States.

Rhode Island
 WLNE Television Tower (Providence ABC 6)
 Height: 1,001 ft (305 m)
 Tiverton
 Year built: 1965
 Owner: Citadel Communications

South Carolina
 WCSC Television Tower (Charleston CBS 5)
 Height: 2,000 ft (609.6 m)
 Awendaw
 Year built: 1986
 Owner: Gray Media
 Diversified Communications Tower
 Height: 2,000 ft (609.6 m)
 Floyd Dale ( 34°22'3.0" N, 79°19'48.0" W)
 Year built: 1981

South Dakota
 KDLT Television Tower (Sioux Falls NBC 46)
 Height: 1,999 ft (609 m)
 Rowena
 Year built: 1999
 Owner: Red River Broadcast LLC

Tennessee
 WIMZ-FM Tower
 Height: 
 Knoxville
 Year built: 1963
 Owner: South Central Communications
 The tower is home to WIMZ-FM 103.5, whose antenna is at the top. When used for television broadcasts by its former owner, Multimedia, Inc. (former licensee of WBIR-TV, Knoxville) it was shielded by mountains from the audience in the western Knoxville suburbs like Farragut, Oak Ridge, and Oliver Springs. This tower was built because the owners of WBIR-TV could not obtain land atop nearby House Mountain, because the only land suitable for a television tower base on the mountain had been purchased by the station's main competitor WATE-TV, Knoxville. When completed, it was for a short time the tallest man-made structure on earth.

Texas
 Tall Towers Era
 Height: 2,000 ft (609.6 m)
 Era
 Year built: 2006
 Owner: Tall Towers Ventures, Inc
 Winnie Broadcasting Tower (103.7 MHz FM)
 Height: 2,000 ft (609.6 m)
 Winnie
 Year built: 2005
 Owner: Educational Media Foundation
 Liverpool Broadcast Tower (Houston 107.5 FM)
 Height: 1,999 ft (609.3 m)
 Liverpool
 Year built: 1986
 Owner: American Tower Corporation
 Salem Radio Properties Tower
 Height: 1,999 ft (609.3 m)
 Collinsville
 Year built: 2002
 Owner: Salem Radio Properties
 Stowell Broadcasting Tower (97.5 MHz FM)
 Height: 1,999 ft (609.3 m)
 Stowell
 Year built: 2001
 Owner: GOW Broadcasting
 Service Broadcasting Tower Decatur
 Height: 1,994 ft (608.1 m)
 Decatur
 Year built: 2000
 Owner: Service Broadcasting Corp.
 Tall Tower Venture Devers
 Height: 1,993 ft (607.7 m)
 Devers
 Year built: 2006
 Owner: Tall Towers Ventures, Inc

Height data according to FCC's ASR entries.

Utah
 Kennecott Smelter Smokestack
 Height: 1,215 ft (370 m)
 Magna
 Year built: 1979
 Owner: Kennecott Utah Copper, LLC
 This incredibly tall smokestack was designed to help the Garfield smelter comply with the Clean Air Act. It is a prominent structure along the shore of the Great Salt Lake adjacent to Interstate 80, about 10 miles (16 km) west of Salt Lake City. The smoke rises to an altitude of 8,540 ft (1,689 m) MSL. The tallest non-smokestack structure is a 660 ft (201 m) radio mast near Plain City, owned by the Bible Broadcasting inc.

Vermont
 WCAT (AM) Tower 1 (Burlington News/Talk 1390)
 Height: 445 ft (136 m)
 Burlington
 Year built: 1981
 Owner: Hometown Broadcasting
 Tower 1 of a 3 tower AM array.

Virginia
 American Tower Corporation Tower Suffolk
 Height: 1,254.9 feet (382.5 m)
 Suffolk at 36°48'31.8" N and 76°30'11.3"
 Year Built: 2003
 Owner: American Tower Corporation )
 WGNT, WHRO-TV, WTKR, WTPC-TV, WTVZ-TV

Washington
 Columbia Center
 Height: 967 ft (295 m)
 Seattle, 701 Fifth Avenue
 Year built: 1982-85
 Owner: Equity Office Properties
 The Columbia Center was intended to be 1,005 ft (306 m) tall but was disapproved by the FAA. It was built in 1982-85 and has 76 floors.
KREM Tower
The tallest antenna tower is the 940 ft (287 m) KREM (CBS-2) tower at Spokane.

West Virginia
Chimney of Mitchell Power Plant
 Height: 1206 ft (368 m)
 Moundsville, West Virginia
 Year built: 1968
 Owner: AEP

Wisconsin
 WEAU Television Tower (Eau Claire NBC 13)
 Height: 1,998 ft (609 m)
 Fairchild
 Year built: 1966
 Owner: WEAU-TV
 Collapsed 3/23/2011

Wyoming
 Gillette Wyoming Legends Communication Tower 
 Height: 1,153 ft (351.4 m)
 Gillette
 Year built: 2009
 Former LORAN-C facility antenna
 Height: 700 ft (213 m)
 Gillette
 Year built: ?
 Owner: U.S. Coast Guard
 This Coast Guard site in Wyoming was part of the worldwide LORAN marine navigation network. The US Loran system was shut down 8 Feb 2010. The tower was especially useful to ships plying the Great Lakes. The system radiated 540 kW of power.

Puerto Rico
 Telemundo WKAQ TV Tower
Height: 1,102 ft (336 m)
Cayey

An incomplete list of the tallest structures in Puerto Rico. Main reference: U.S. Federal Communications Commission (FCC) database

By structural type
Tallest structures in the United States for different uses/structural types. Please expand and/or correct, if necessary

See also
List of tallest structures in the United States by height

Notes and references

External links
 http://skyscraperpage.com/diagrams/?searchID=37743190

Tallest structures in the United States